Prostaglandin G2 is an organic peroxide belonging to the family of prostaglandins. The compound has been isolated as a solid, although it is usually used in vivo.  It quickly converts into prostaglandin H2, a process catalyzed by the enzyme COX. 

Prostaglandin G2 is produced from the fatty acid arachidonic acid.  The reaction, an oxygenation, requires the enzyme cyclooxygenase, which inserts two molecules of O2 into the C-H bonds of the substrate acid.

References

Prostaglandins